Charles Clayton (October 5, 1825 – October 4, 1885) was a United States representative from California. He was born in Derbyshire, England. He was the Alcalde of Santa Clara, California from 1849 to 1850. He was a miller and founded the Santa Clara flour mills.

Clayton was one of San Francisco's 12 representatives in the California State Assembly from 1863 to 1867. He was also a member of the board of supervisors of San Francisco from 1864 to 1869. He was the United States surveyor of customs of the port and district of San Francisco in 1870. He was elected as a Republican to the Forty-third Congress (March 4, 1873 - March 3, 1875). He was not a candidate for renomination to the Forty-fourth Congress in 1874. He also served as the California state prison director from 1881 to 1882. He died in Oakland, California, one day before his 60th birthday. He was buried in Mountain View Cemetery.

References

1825 births
1885 deaths
Republican Party members of the California State Assembly
Politicians from San Francisco
Politicians from Derbyshire
English emigrants to the United States
Republican Party members of the United States House of Representatives from California
19th-century American politicians